Bitten is a Canadian television series based on the Women of the Otherworld series of books by author Kelley Armstrong. The name was inspired by the first book in the series. The show was produced as an original series for Space, with most filming in Toronto and Cambridge, Ontario. Its third and final season finished in April 2016.

Series overview 

The first season's story centres on Elena Michaels (portrayed by Laura Vandervoort), a female werewolf who is torn between a normal life in Toronto with her human boyfriend, Philip, and her "family" obligations as a werewolf in upstate New York. Among her pack is her ex-fiancé Clayton, who is responsible for her becoming a werewolf.

In the second season, the narrative is featured as the story centres on the aftermath of the battle, as well as the meeting of witches Paige and Ruth, who are looking to save their lost coven member, Savannah, from evil warlock Aleister.

Cast and characters

Main 
 Laura Vandervoort as Elena Michaels
 Greyston Holt as Clayton Danvers
 Greg Bryk as Jeremy Danvers
 Steve Lund as Nick Sorrentino
 Paul Greene as Philip McAdams (season 1)
 Michael Xavier as Logan Jonsen (seasons 1–2)
 Genelle Williams as Rachel Sutton (season 3, recurring seasons 1–2)
 Tommie-Amber Pirie as Paige Winterbourne (season 3, recurring season 2)

Recurring 
 Paulino Nunes as Antonio Sorrentino (season 1)
 Joel Keller as Peter Myers (season 1)
 Benjamin Ayres as Jorge Sorrentino (seasons 1, 3)
 Elias Toufexis as Joey Stillwell
 Michael Luckett as Daniel Santos (season 1)
 James McGowan as Malcolm Danvers (seasons 1–2)
 Noah Danby as Zachary Cain
 Pascal Langdale as Karl Marsten
 Curtis Carravaggio as Thomas LeBlanc (season 1)
 Patrick Garrow as Victor Olson (season 1)
 Marc Bendavid as Scott Brandon (season 1)
 Ryan Kelly as Nate Parker (seasons 1–2)
 Dan Petronijevic as Samuel Boggs (season 1)
 Fiona Highet as Sheriff Karen Morgan (seasons 1, 3)
 Rogan Christopher as Deputy Paul O'Neil (season 1)
 Natalie Brown as Diane McAdams (seasons 1–2)
 Sherry Miller as Olivia McAdams (season 1)
 Eve Harlow as Amber (season 1)
 Natalie Lisinska as Sylvie (season 1)
 Ace Hicks as Becky McAdams (season 1)
 Evan Buliung as Michael Braxton (season 1)
 Noah Cappe as Travis (season 1)
 Chris Ratz as Jack (season 1)
 Kaitlyn Leeb as Amanda (season 1)
 Tammy Isbell as Ruth Winterbourne (season 2)
 Sean Rogerson as Aleister (season 2)
 Kiara Glasco as Savannah Levine (season 2)
 Debra McCabe as Clara Sullivan (season 2)
 Angela Besharah as Bridget (season 2)
 Carly Street as Dr. Sondra Bauer (season 2)
 Daniel Kash as Roman Navikev (seasons 2–3)
 Brock Johnson as Richard Hart (season 2)
 Mishka Thebaud as Eduardo Escobado (seasons 2–3)
 Salvatore Antonio as Rodrigo Sanchez (season 2)
 John Ralston as Sasha Antonov (season 3)
 Sofia Banzhaf as Katia Antonov (season 3)
 Alex Ozerov as Alexei Antonov (season 3)
 Rafael Petardi as Konstantin Saranin (season 3)
 Oliver Becker as The Albino (season 3)
 Ian Lake as Anson Haight (season 3)
 Ian Matthews as Bucky Durst (season 3)

Guests 
 Mackenzie Gray as Jimmy Koenig (season 1)
 Shauna MacDonald as Lily Bevelaqua (season 2)
 Mark Irvingsen as Freddie Durst (season 3)
 Steve Puchalski as Leon Durst (season 3)

Production 
On May 22, 2014, the series was renewed for a second season of 10 episodes, with production beginning in Summer. On May 22, 2015, Space confirmed that the series would be renewed for a third season, with filming set to begin in the summer / fall of 2015. It was confirmed in December 2015 that the third season of Bitten would be its final one.

Music 
Todor Kobakov was hired to compose the score for the series.

Score 

Bitten – Score Soundtrack Vol. 1 was released on March 18, 2014.

Broadcast 
The series was acquired by Syfy for airing in the United States, and premiered in January 2014. It premiered in Australia on August 8, 2015 on FOX8. SyfyUK commenced broadcast on May 19, 2016.

Home media

Reception

Ratings
In ratings, Bitten averaged 348,000 viewers in its timeslot, making it Space's highest-rated original series of all time.

Awards and nominations

InnerSpace: After Bite 
A live after-show titled InnerSpace: After Bite premiered on Space on February 7, 2015, following the season two premiere. After Bite features hosts Morgan Hoffman and Teddy Wilson discussing the latest episode with actors and producers of Bitten.

References

External links 

 
 

2010s Canadian drama television series
2014 Canadian television series debuts
2016 Canadian television series endings
Canadian fantasy television series
English-language television shows
CTV Sci-Fi Channel original programming
Television shows filmed in Toronto
Television shows set in Toronto
Television shows set in New York (state)
Television about werewolves
Television series by Bell Media
Television series by Entertainment One
Witchcraft in television